Advie is a small village in Strathspey, in the Highland Council Area of Scotland. It lies to the south of the River Spey, and next to the A95 road, roughly halfway between Grantown-on-Spey and Aberlour.

History

Advie was in the County of Moray, within the ecclesiastical parish and civil parish of "Cromdale, Inverallan and Advie". Although the ecclesiastical parish was combined in the sixteenth century, the village still has its own church and an old cemetery.  A fragment of a Class I Pictish Stone - believed to have been found in the old burial ground - is now preserved in the vestry wall of the present church. Another building of note is The Manse, located nearby.

The village was served by Advie railway station, on the Strathspey Railway. The station opened in 1863, but closed, along with the rest of the line, in 1965.

References

External links

Populated places in Badenoch and Strathspey
Former church parishes of Scotland